Planet X is the first studio album by keyboardist Derek Sherinian, released on July 13, 1999 through Magna Carta Records. The album was devised after Sherinian left progressive metal band Dream Theater in January 1999. He then joined drummer Virgil Donati in forming a band also named Planet X, which released their own first album Universe in 2000. Guitarist Brett Garsed, who plays on Planet X, would later return on the band Planet X's album Quantum in 2007.

Critical reception

Glenn Astarita at All About Jazz gave Planet X a positive review, calling it "prog-rock heaven with a few fusion bites thrown in for good measure" and "A highly entertaining effort featuring some almost superhuman ensemble work". He praised the "strong compositional and arranging skills" of Sherinian and Donati, and the "crunching guitar work" of Garsed.

Steve Huey at AllMusic gave the album three stars out of five. He, too, praised each musician's performance, as well as likening the compositional influences to that of Steve Vai and King Crimson.

Track listing

Personnel

Derek Sherinian – keyboard, production
Brett Garsed – guitar
Virgil Donati – drums
Tony Franklin – bass
Tom Fletcher – engineering, mixing, production

References

External links
In Review: Derek Sherinian "Planet X" at Guitar Nine Records

Derek Sherinian albums
1999 debut albums
Magna Carta Records albums